Daniela Denise Katzenberger (born 1 October 1986) is a German reality TV personality, TV host, model, and singer. She has featured in several television shows in Germany, mostly on VOX. Her first single, a version of "Nothing's gonna stop me now", reached number 19 on the German single charts in 2010.

Early life
Katzenberger was born and raised in Ludwigshafen am Rhein. After secondary school, she trained and qualified as a beautician. Her mother, Iris Klein, was a participant in the 10th season of the German version of TV show Big Brother and the German version of I'm a Celebrity...Get Me Out of Here!. Her sister was 2018 also member in the German Version of I'm a Celebrity...Get Me Out of Here! and won the show.

Career

In 2009, Katzenberger lost the Top Model of the World Mallorca beauty competition. Her breakthrough came in the same year when she featured in the VOX television soap opera Auf und davon – Mein Auslandstagebuch ("Up and Away – My Diary Abroad"). In the show, a camera crew followed Katzenberger as she attempted to break into photographic modelling in the United States, including trying to meet Hugh Hefner and applying to appear in the American Playboy magazine, neither of which succeed. In the second season of the show, the viewers follow her as she undergoes plastic surgery to further her glamour modelling career.

Katzenberger also featured in MTV Home and at the VIVA Comet Awards 2010.

From January 2010, she was featured in the TV show Goodbye Deutschland! Die Auswanderer ("Goodbye Germany! The Emigrants") as she opened a café in Santa Ponsa, Mallorca. The show had up to 2.29 million viewers and 11% market share. She also appeared in the music video "Vamos a la playa" by Loona.

Katzenberger signed a recording contract with EMI in May 2010, and her first single, a cover of Samantha Fox's "Nothing's gonna stop me now" was released. The song reached number 19 in the German charts and number 14 in Austria. The song was released as a digital download and audio CD in August 2010. 

Katzenberger  has her own show on the German TV channel VOX, . It started airing on 21 September 2010.

In 2016, Katzenberger launched her new app Love and Style that advertises her clothes and beauty products.

Katzenberger has written several biographies. She has signed numerous advertising deals with companies such as Kaufland, Lidl, Poco, and Uncle Sam.

Personal life
In 2015 she switched over to RTL II, where she married her husband with a big wedding on her own show.

Discography

Albums

Singles

Filmography

Awards
 2011: VIVA Comet Music Awards – Best New Starter (nominated, second place)
 2011: Licensing Excellence Awards (LIMA-Awards) for Brand/VIP Sport Brand of the Year
 2011: 8th Quotenmeter.de Television Awards, Best Reality-Show for "Daniela Katzenberger – natürlich blond"
 2011: Bravo Otto in Silver for TV-Star (female)
 2012: Bravo Otto in Silver for TV-Star (female)

Autobiography
 Sei schlau, stell dich dumm (Be smart, stand stupid), Köln 2011, 
 Katze küsst Kater: Mein Buch über die Liebe (Cat kisses Tomcat: My book about love), Köln 2013, 
 Eine Tussi wird Mama: Neun Monate auf dem Weg zum Katzenbaby, Köln 2015,

References

External links

 Official website (in German)

1986 births
Living people
People from Ludwigshafen
German television actresses
German female models
German expatriates in Spain
Beauticians
German television personalities
21st-century German actresses
Katzenberger, Daniela
21st-century German women singers